Gomadzor is a residential neighborhood in the town of Sevan of Gegharkunik Province, Armenia. It is located to the north of the town centre.

See also 
Gegharkunik Province

References 

Populated places in Gegharkunik Province